Carman-Ainsworth may refer to:
Carman-Ainsworth Community Schools, school district in Genesee County, MI
Carman-Ainsworth High School, senior high school in the district